Arulselvam Rayappan is the  Bishop of the Roman Catholic Diocese of Salem.

Early life and education 
Arulselvam was born on 18 November 1960 in Tamil Nadu, India. He received his bachelor's degree in Philosophy from  Arul Anandar College, Karumathur. He has acquired a master's degree in canon law from St. Peter's Pontifical Seminary. He also obtained Doctorate in Canon Law with Summa Cum Laude from the Pontifical Urban University Rome.

Priesthood 
On 20 May 1986, Arul received his priestly ordination.

Episcopate 
Rayappan was appointed bishop of the Roman Catholic Diocese of Salem on 31 May 2021 by Pope Francis. He was consecrated as a Bishop on 4 August 2021 and took possession of the Diocese of Salem on the same day. He was consecrated as a bishop by Archbishop Antony Pappusamy of Madurai who served as the Principal Consecrator and Bishop Emeritus Sebastianappan Singaroyan of Salem and Bishop Lawrence Pius of Dharmapuri served as Co-Consecrators.

References

External links 

1960 births
Bishops appointed by Pope Francis
Living people
21st-century Roman Catholic bishops in India
Pontifical Urban University alumni